The 2017–18 Indiana Pacers season was Indiana's 51st season as a franchise and 42nd season in the NBA. For the first time since 2010, Paul George was not on the team's roster as he was traded to the Oklahoma City Thunder in the previous off-season. Despite that, the Pacers improved on their previous year's record and clinched a playoff berth for the third straight season. Their season featured the emergence of Victor Oladipo, who the Pacers received as part of the trade for George.

The Pacers finished the regular season with a record of 48–34, which clinched the 5th seed in the Eastern Conference. In the playoffs, the Pacers faced the 4th seeded Cleveland Cavaliers, who had previously swept the Pacers in the first round of the 2017 NBA Playoffs. The Pacers were once again defeated in the first round, losing to the Cavaliers in seven games.

NBA draft

T. J. Leaf and Ike Anigbogu were both considered first round picks of the draft that were also teammates in their sole seasons at UCLA. Leaf was their starting power forward and that led the team in scoring with 16.3 points per game, while also averaging 8.2 rebounds 2.4 assists, and 1.1 blocks per game as a starting. Leaf was also named a member of the All-Pac-12 First Team and All-Pac-12 Freshman Team. Anigbogu was a backup center for UCLA and averaged 4.7 points, 4.0 rebounds, and 1.2 blocks in 13 minutes of action per game, he was projected as a potential first round pick for his athleticism and defensive capabilities; He dropped to the later half of the second round possibly due to a knee injury he sustained during a Pacers pre-draft workout. The Pacers selected Edmond Sumner as their final pick of the draft, a point guard who was also rehabilitating himself from a knee injury during the NBA draft process. In his junior season, Sumner was then the second leading scorer for Xavier but failed to complete the season after suffering a serious knee injury on a January 29, 2017 in a win against St. John's University. He averaged 14.3 points, 4.8 assists, and 4.2 rebounds per game with the Musketeers in his final year. Edmond became the first ever Pacer in franchise history to sign a two-way contract.

Roster

Standings

Division

Conference

Game log

Preseason

|- style="background:#bfb;"
| 1
| October 4
| @ Milwaukee
| 
| Lance Stephenson (17)
| Myles Turner (9)
| Lance Stephenson (6)
| Bradley Center6,691
| 1–0
|- style="background:#bfb;"
| 2
| October 6
| @ Cleveland
| 
| T. J. Leaf (18)
| Thaddeus Young (8)
| Joseph, Oladipo (5)
| Quicken Loans Arena19,432
| 2–0
|- style="background:#fcc;"
| 3
| October 9
| @ Detroit
| 
| Damien Wilkins (14)
| Jarrod Uthoff (7)
| Joe Young (5)
| Little Caesars Arena12,721
| 2–1
|- style="background:#bfb;"
| 4
| October 10
| Maccabi Haifa
|
| Victor Oladipo (18)
| Domantas Sabonis (13)
| Cory Joseph (5)
| Bankers Life Fieldhouse9,110
| 3–1

Regular season

|- style="background:#cfc;"
| 1
| October 18
| Brooklyn
| 
| Victor Oladipo (22)
| Myles Turner (14)
| Darren Collison (11)
| Bankers Life Fieldhouse15,008
| 1–0
|- style="background:#fcc;"
| 2
| October 20
| Portland
| 
| Leaf, Oladipo (17)
| Domantas Sabonis (8)
| Darren Collison (4)
| Bankers Life Fieldhouse15,325
| 1–1
|- style="background:#fcc;"
| 3
| October 21
| @ Miami
| 
| Victor Oladipo (28)
| Domantas Sabonis (12)
| Darren Collison (8)
| AmericanAirlines Arena19,600
| 1–2
|- style="background:#cfc;"
| 4
| October 24
| @ Minnesota
| 
| Victor Oladipo (28)
| Domantas Sabonis (11)
| Darren Collison (16)
| Target Center14,353
| 2–2
|- style="background:#fcc;"
| 5
| October 25
| @ Oklahoma City
| 
| Victor Oladipo (35)
| Domantas Sabonis (11)
| Darren Collison (3)
| Chesapeake Energy Arena18,203
| 2–3
|- style="background:#cfc;"
| 6
| October 29
| San Antonio
| 
| Victor Oladipo (23)
| Domantas Sabonis (12)
| Darren Collison (6)
| Bankers Life Fieldhouse15,013
| 3–3
|- style="background:#cfc;"
| 7
| October 31
| Sacramento
| 
| Bojan Bogdanovic (17)
| Domantas Sabonis (16)
| Sabonis, Stephenson (5)
| Bankers Life Fieldhouse12,245
| 4–3

|- style="background:#cfc;"
| 8
| November 1
| @ Cleveland
| 
| Thaddeus Young (26)
| Domantas Sabonis (12)
| Darren Collison (8)
| Quicken Loans Arena20,562
| 5–3
|- style="background:#fcc;"
| 9
| November 3
| @ Philadelphia
| 
| Victor Oladipo (31)
| Myles Turner (9)
| Victor Oladipo (7)
| Wells Fargo Center20,668
| 5–4
|- style="background:#fcc;"
| 10
| November 5
| @ New York
| 
| Thaddeus Young (18)
| Domantas Sabonis (8)
| Darren Collison (10)
| Madison Square Garden17,889
| 5–5
|- style="background:#fcc;"
| 11
| November 7
| New Orleans
| 
| Myles Turner (21)
| Myles Turner (12)
| Darren Collison (6)
| Bankers Life Fieldhouse15,014
| 5–6
|- style="background:#fcc;"
| 12
| November 8
| @ Detroit
| 
| Victor Oladipo (21)
| Bojan Bogdanovic (7)
| Cory Joseph (6)
| Little Caesars Arena14,407
| 5–7
|- style="background:#cfc;"
| 13
| November 10
| @ Chicago
| 
| Victor Oladipo (26)
| Sabonis, Turner (9)
| Darren Collison (7)
| United Center22,416
| 6–7
|- style="background:#fcc;"
| 14
| November 12
| Houston
| 
| Victor Oladipo (28)
| Lance Stephenson (10)
| Joseph, Stephenson (3)
| Bankers Life Fieldhouse15,581
| 6–8
|- style="background:#cfc;"
| 15
| November 15
| @ Memphis
| 
| Darren Collison (30)
| Lance Stephenson (7)
| Darren Collison (8)
| FedExForum16,033
| 7–8
|- style="background:#cfc;"
| 16
| November 17
| Detroit
| 
| Victor Oladipo (21)
| Victor Oladipo (15)
| Darren Collison (6)
| Bankers Life Fieldhouse17,188
| 8–8
|- style="background:#cfc;"
| 17
| November 19
| @ Miami
| 
| Bojan Bogdanovic (26)
| Domantas Sabonis (10)
| Darren Collison (10)
| AmericanAirlines Arena19,600
| 9–8
|- style="background:#cfc;"
| 18
| November 20
| @ Orlando
| 
| Victor Oladipo (29)
| Lance Stephenson (10)
| Darren Collison (8)
| Amway Center17,239
| 10–8
|- style="background:#cfc;"
| 19
| November 24
| Toronto
| 
| Victor Oladipo (21)
| Myles Turner (10)
| Darren Collison (8)
| Bankers Life Fieldhouse16,523
| 11–8
|- style="background:#fcc;"
| 20
| November 25
| Boston
| 
| Myles Turner (19)
| Sabonis, Stephenson (8)
| Collison, Stephenson (5)
| Bankers Life Fieldhouse16,303
| 11–9
|- style="background:#cfc;"
| 21
| November 27
| Orlando
| 
| Victor Oladipo (26)
| Sabonis, Stephenson (8)
| Oladipo, Sabonis, Stephenson, Young (5)
| Bankers Life Fieldhouse12,501
| 12–9
|- style="background:#fcc;"
| 22
| November 29
| @ Houston
| 
| Thaddeus Young (23)
| Myles Turner (10)
| Collison, Oladipo (5)
| Toyota Center16,760
| 12–10

|- style="background:#fcc;"
| 23
| December 1
| @ Toronto
| 
| Victor Oladipo (36)
| Domantas Sabonis (8)
| Collison, Oladipo (6)
| Air Canada Centre19,800
| 12–11
|- style="background:#cfc;"
| 24
| December 4
| New York
| 
| Thaddeus Young (20)
| Domantas Sabonis (12)
| Darren Collison (10)
| Bankers Life Fieldhouse12,018
| 13–11
|- style="background:#cfc;"
| 25
| December 6
| Chicago
| 
| Victor Oladipo (27)
| Thaddeus Young (9)
| Darren Collison (6)
| Bankers Life Fieldhouse13,013
| 14–11
|- style="background:#cfc;"
| 26
| December 8
| Cleveland
| 
| Victor Oladipo (33)
| Domantas Sabonis (9)
| Victor Oladipo (5)
| Bankers Life Fieldhouse17,032
| 15–11
|- style="background:#cfc;"
| 27
| December 10
| Denver
| 
| Victor Oladipo (47)
| Myles Turner (8)
| Oladipo, Stephenson (6)
| Bankers Life Fieldhouse14,587
| 16–11
|- style="background:#fcc;"
| 28
| December 13
| Oklahoma City
| 
| Victor Oladipo (19)
| Thaddeus Young (10)
| Victor Oladipo (6)
| Bankers Life Fieldhouse17,923
| 16–12
|- style="background:#fcc;"
| 29
| December 15
| Detroit
| 
| Victor Oladipo (26)
| Oladipo, Stephenson, Turner, Young  (8)
| Lance Stephenson (5)
| Bankers Life Fieldhouse18,165
| 16–13
|- style="background:#cfc;"
| 30
| December 17
| @  Brooklyn
| 
| Victor Oladipo (26)
| Domantas Sabonis (8)
| Darren Collison (7)
| Barclays Center13,934
| 17–13
|- style="background:#fcc;"
| 31
| December 18
| Boston
| 
| Victor Oladipo (38)
| Domantas Sabonis (7)
| Joseph, Stephenson (3)
| Bankers Life Fieldhouse16,055
| 17–14
|- style="background:#cfc;"
| 32
| December 20
| @  Atlanta
| 
| Victor Oladipo (23)
| Stephenson, Young (8)
| Lance Stephenson (6)
| Philips Arena14,830
| 18–14
|- style="background:#cfc;"
| 33
| December 23
| Brooklyn
| 
| Victor Oladipo (38)
| Sabonis, Turner (9)
| Darren Collison (9)
| Bankers Life Fieldhouse18,165
| 19–14
|- style="background:#fcc;"
| 34
| December 26
| @  Detroit
| 
| Victor Oladipo (13)
| Lance Stephenson (6)
| Oladipo, Sabonis, Stephenson, Turner (3)
| Little Caesars Arena20,451
| 19–15
|- style="background:#fcc;"
| 35
| December 27
| Dallas
| 
| Collison, Stephenson, Turner (16)
| Lance Stephenson (15)
| Darren Collison (7)
| Bankers Life Fieldhouse17,923
| 19–16
|- style="background:#fcc;"
| 36
| December 29
| @  Chicago
| 
| Darren Collison (30)
| Sabonis, Stephenson (9)
| Darren Collison (6)
| United Center21,178
| 19–17
|- style="background:#fcc;"
| 37
| December 31
| Minnesota
| 
| Joe Young (20)
| Domantas Sabonis (11)
| Cory Joseph (4)
| Bankers Life Fieldhouse17,923
| 19–18

|- style="background:#fcc;"
| 38
| January 3
| @ Milwaukee
| 
| Domantas Sabonis (24)
| Joseph, Stephenson (7)
| Cory Joseph (6)
| BMO Harris Bradley Center15,613
| 19–19
|- style="background:#cfc;"
| 39
| January 6
| Chicago
| 
| Victor Oladipo (23)
| Cory Joseph (10)
| Victor Oladipo (9)
| Bankers Life Fieldhouse17,923
| 20–19
|- style="background:#cfc;"
| 40
| January 8
| Milwaukee
| 
| Domantas Sabonis (17)
| Domantas Sabonis (10)
| Darren Collison (7)
| Bankers Life Fieldhouse14,670
| 21–19
|- style="background:#fcc;"
| 41
| January 10
| Miami
| 
| Victor Oladipo (26)
| Thaddeus Young (9)
| Oladipo, Stephenson (4)
| Bankers Life Fieldhouse14,540
| 21–20
|- style="background:#cfc;"
| 42
| January 12
| Cleveland
| 
| Darren Collison (22)
| Myles Turner (15)
| Collison, Stephenson (4)
| Bankers Life Fieldhouse17,923
| 22–20
|- style="background:#cfc;"
| 43
| January 14
| @ Phoenix
| 
| Darren Collison (19)
| Domantas Sabonis (14)
| Cory Joseph (6)
| Talking Stick Resort Arena17,091
| 23–20
|- style="background:#cfc;"
| 44
| January 15
| @ Utah
| 
| Victor Oladipo (28)
| Al Jefferson (10)
| Collison, Oladipo (6)
| Vivint Smart Home Arena18,306
| 24–20
|- style="background:#fcc;"
| 45
| January 18
| @ Portland
| 
| Collison, Oladipo (23)
| Thaddeus Young (14)
| Collison, Oladipo, Sabonis, Young (3)
| Moda Center19,071
| 24–21
|- style="background:#fcc;"
| 46
| January 19
| @ LA Lakers
| 
| Collison, Oladipo (25)
| Domantas Sabonis (14)
| Collison, Oladipo (4)
| Staples Center18,997
| 24–22
|- style="background:#cfc;"
| 47
| January 21
| @ San Antonio
| 
| Victor Oladipo (17)
| Lance Stephenson (8)
| Collison, Young (4)
| AT&T Center18,418
| 25–22
|- style="background:#cfc;"
| 48
| January 24
| Phoenix
| 
| Thaddeus Young (22)
| Lance Stephenson (9)
| Victor Oladipo (9)
| Bankers Life Fieldhouse14,060
| 26–22
|- style="background:#fcc;"
| 49
| January 26
| @ Cleveland
| 
| Victor Oladipo (25)
| Domantas Sabonis (11)
| Collison, Oladipo (7)
| Quicken Loans Arena20,562
| 26–23
|- style="background:#cfc;"
| 50
| January 27
| Orlando
| 
| Victor Oladipo (24)
| Domantas Sabonis (9)
| Darren Collison (7)
| Bankers Life Fieldhouse17,923
| 27–23
|- style="background:#cfc;"
| 51
| January 29
| Charlotte
| 
| Victor Oladipo (25)
| Domantas Sabonis (10)
| Darren Collison (6)
| Bankers Life Fieldhouse14,225
| 28–23
|- style="background:#cfc;"
| 52
| January 31
| Memphis
| 
| Bojan Bogdanovic (21)
| Myles Turner (11)
| Oladipo, Young (5)
| Bankers Life Fieldhouse15,093
| 29–23

|- style="background:#fcc;"
| 53
| February 2
| @ Charlotte
| 
| Victor Oladipo (35)
| Myles Turner (11)
| Darren Collison (4)
| Spectrum Center17,135
| 29–24
|- style="background:#cfc;"
| 54
| February 3
| Philadelphia
| 
| Bogdanovic, Oladipo (19)
| Victor Oladipo (9)
| Domantas Sabonis (6)
| Bankers Life Fieldhouse17,923
| 30–24
|- style="background:#fcc;"
| 55
| February 5
| Washington
| 
| Bojan Bogdanovic (29)
| Lance Stephenson (9)
| Lance Stephenson (6)
| Bankers Life Fieldhouse13,169
| 30–25
|- style="background:#bbb;"
| —
| February 7
| @ New Orleans
| colspan="4" |Postponed due to water leak in arena roof (March 21)
| Smoothie King Center
|
|- style="background:#cfc;"
| 56
| February 9
| @ Boston
| 
| Victor Oladipo (35)
| Thaddeus Young (14)
| Cory Joseph (7)
| TD Garden18,624
| 31–25
|- style="background:#cfc;"
| 57
| February 11
| New York
| 
| Victor Oladipo (30)
| Thaddeus Young (11)
| Victor Oladipo (9)
| Bankers Life Fieldhouse17,923
| 32–25
|- style="background:#cfc;"
| 58
| February 14
| @ Brooklyn
| 
| Victor Oladipo (25)
| Myles Turner (14)
| Victor Oladipo (4)
| Barclays Center13,159
| 33–25
|- style="background:#cfc;"
| 59
| February 23
| Atlanta
| 
| Domantas Sabonis (21)
| Domantas Sabonis (13)
| Victor Oladipo (9)
| Bankers Life Fieldhouse17,923
| 34–25
|- style="background:#fcc;"
| 60
| February 26
| @ Dallas
| 
| Myles Turner (24)
| Thaddeus Young (14)
| Oladipo, Stephenson (4)
| American Airlines Center19,536
| 34–26
|- style="background:#fcc;"
| 61
| February 28
| @ Atlanta
| 
| Bojan Bogdanovic (26)
| Domantas Sabonis (12)
| Victor Oladipo (5)
| Philips Arena13,316
| 34–27

|- style="background:#cfc;"
| 62
| March 2
| @ Milwaukee
| 
| Victor Oladipo (21)
| Myles Turner (9)
| Victor Oladipo (6)
| Bradley Center17,217
| 35–27
|- style="background:#cfc;"
| 63
| March 4
| @ Washington
| 
| Victor Oladipo (33)
| Myles Turner (13)
| Oladipo, Turner (3)
| Capital One Arena16,646
| 36–27
|- style="background:#cfc;"
| 64
| March 5
| Milwaukee
| 
| Bojan Bogdanovic (29)
| Thaddeus Young (7)
| Victor Oladipo (5)
| Bankers Life Fieldhouse15,874
| 37–27
|- style="background:#fcc;"
| 65
| March 7
| Utah
| 
| Myles Turner (24)
| Domantas Sabonis (9)
| Victor Oladipo (7)
| Bankers Life Fieldhouse16,432
| 37–28
|- style="background:#cfc;"
| 66
| March 9
| Atlanta
| 
| Bojan Bogdanovic (21)
| Myles Turner (12)
| Collison, Oladipo (5)
| Bankers Life Fieldhouse17,923
| 38–28
|- style="background:#cfc;"
| 67
| March 11
| @ Boston
| 
| Victor Oladipo (27)
| Myles Turner (10)
| Darren Collison (10)
| TD Garden18,624
| 39–28
|- style="background:#cfc;"
| 68
| March 13
| @ Philadelphia
| 
| Myles Turner (25)
| Thaddeus Young (10)
| Cory Joseph (5)
| Wells Fargo Center20,531
| 40–28
|- style="background:#fcc;"
| 69
| March 15
| Toronto
| 
| Darren Collison (22)
| Al Jefferson (12)
| Collison, Joseph (4)
| Bankers Life Fieldhouse17,923
| 40–29
|- style="background:#fcc;"
| 70
| March 17
| @ Washington
| 
| Lance Stephenson (25)
| Al Jefferson (9)
| Darren Collison (6)
| Capital One Arena18,249
| 40–30
|- style="background:#cfc;"
| 71
| March 19
| LA Lakers
| 
| Myles Turner (21)
| Thaddeus Young (9)
| Darren Collison (8)
| Bankers Life Fieldhouse16,603
| 41–30
|- style="background:#fcc;"
| 72
| March 21
| @ New Orleans
| 
| Victor Oladipo (21)
| Young, Turner (10)
| Darren Collison (6)
| Smoothie King Center14,148
| 41–31
|- style="background:#cfc;"
| 73
| March 23
| LA Clippers
| 
| Bojan Bogdanovic (28)
| Thaddeus Young (10)
| Darren Collison (10)
| Bankers Life Fieldhouse17,923
| 42–31
|- style="background:#cfc;"
| 74
| March 25
| Miami
| 
| Victor Oladipo (23)
| Cory Joseph (10)
| Cory Joseph (7)
| Bankers Life Fieldhouse17,923
| 43–31
|- style="background:#cfc;"
| 75
| March 27
| @ Golden State
| 
| Victor Oladipo (24)
| Thaddeus Young (10)
| Victor Oladipo (6)
| Oracle Arena19,596
| 44–31
|- style="background:#cfc;"
| 76
| March 29
| @ Sacramento
| 
| Bojan Bogdanovic (25)
| Sabonis, Youug (10)
| Darren Collison (9)
| Golden 1 Center17,583
| 45–31

|- style="background:#cfc;"
| 77
| April 1
| @ LA Clippers
| 
| Victor Oladipo (30)
| Thaddeus Young (9)
| Victor Oladipo (12)
| Staples Center15,866
| 46–31
|- style="background:#fcc;"
| 78
| April 3
| @ Denver
| 
| Victor Oladipo (25)
| Thaddeus Young (10)
| Victor Oladipo (7)
| Pepsi Center14,743
| 46–32
|- style="background:#cfc;"
| 79
| April 5
| Golden State
| 
| Bojan Bogdanovic (28)
| Domantas Sabonis (9)
| Victor Oladipo (7)
| Bankers Life Fieldhouse17,923
| 47–32
|- style="background:#fcc;"
| 80
| April 6
| @ Toronto
| 
| Glenn Robinson III (12)
| Lance Stephenson (8)
| Darren Collison (5)
| Air Canada Centre19,924
| 47–33
|- style="background:#cfc;"
| 81
| April 8
| @ Charlotte
| 
| Victor Oladipo (27)
| Lance Stephenson (10)
| Lance Stephenson (10)
| Spectrum Center16,629
| 48–33
|- style="background:#fcc;"
| 82
| April 10
| Charlotte
| 
| Collison, Leaf, Robinson III (13)
| Lance Stephenson (13)
| Cory Joseph (8)
| Bankers Life Fieldhouse17,331
| 48–34

Playoffs

|- style="background:#cfc;"
| 1
| April 15
| @ Cleveland
| 
| Victor Oladipo (32)
| Myles Turner (8)
| Darren Collison (6)
| Quicken Loans Arena20,562
| 1–0
|- style="background:#fcc;"
| 2
| April 18
| @ Cleveland
| 
| Victor Oladipo (22)
| Thaddeus Young (6)
| Collison, Oladipo (6)
| Quicken Loans Arena20,562
| 1–1
|- style="background:#cfc;"
| 3
| April 20
| Cleveland
| 
| Bojan Bogdanovic (30)
| Myles Turner (10)
| Victor Oladipo (7)
| Bankers Life Fieldhouse17,923
| 2–1
|- style="background:#fcc;"
| 4
| April 22
| Cleveland
| 
| Domantas Sabonis (19)
| Thaddeus Young (16)
| Darren Collison (8)
| Bankers Life Fieldhouse17,923
| 2–2
|- style="background:#fcc;"
| 5
| April 25
| @ Cleveland
| 
| Domantas Sabonis (22)
| Victor Oladipo (12)
| Cory Joseph (6)
| Quicken Loans Arena20,562
| 2–3
|- style="background:#cfc;"
| 6
| April 27
| Cleveland
| 
| Victor Oladipo (28)
| Victor Oladipo (13)
| Victor Oladipo (10)
| Bankers Life Fieldhouse17,923
| 3–3
|- style="background:#fcc;"
| 7
| April 29
| @ Cleveland
| 
| Victor Oladipo (30)
| Victor Oladipo (12)
| Victor Oladipo (6)
| Quicken Loans Arena20,562
| 3–4

Player Statistics

Regular season

Playoffs

Player Statistics Citation:

Transactions

Trades

Free agents

Re-signed

Additions

Subtractions

References

Indiana Pacers seasons
Indiana Pacers
Indiana Pacers
Indiana Pacers